George Thomas Webster (born 7 August 1949) is a Canadian politician. He represented the electoral district of Borden-Kinkora in the Legislative Assembly of Prince Edward Island from 2007 to 2015 as a member of the Liberal Party.

In June 2007, Webster was appointed to the Executive Council of Prince Edward Island as Minister of Environment, Energy and Forestry. In January 2009, Webster was moved to Minister of Agriculture. In January 2010, he was named the first deputy premier of Prince Edward Island and Minister of Agriculture and Forestry.

Webster did not reoffer in the 2015 election.

References

Living people
People from Prince County, Prince Edward Island
Prince Edward Island Liberal Party MLAs
Deputy premiers of Prince Edward Island
Farmers from Prince Edward Island
Members of the Executive Council of Prince Edward Island
21st-century Canadian politicians
1949 births